In enzymology, a mycocerosate synthase is an enzyme that catalyzes the chemical reaction

acyl-CoA + n methylmalonyl-CoA + 2n NADPH + 2n H+  multi-methyl-branched acyl-CoA + n CoA + n CO2 + 2n NADP+

The 4 substrates of this enzyme are acyl-CoA, methylmalonyl-CoA, NADPH, and H+, whereas its 4 products are multi-methyl-branched acyl-CoA, CoA, CO2, and NADP+.

This enzyme belongs to the family of transferases, specifically those acyltransferases transferring groups other than aminoacyl groups.  The systematic name of this enzyme class is acyl-CoA:methylmalonyl-CoA C-acyltransferase (decarboxylating, oxoacyl- and enoyl-reducing). This enzyme is also called mycocerosic acid synthase.

References

 

EC 2.3.1
NADPH-dependent enzymes
Enzymes of unknown structure